Nubiology is the designation given to the primarily archaeological science that specialises in the scientific and historical study of Ancient Nubia and its antiquities. 

It is sometimes also applied to scientists who study other ancient lands and cultures south of Ancient Egypt. The term was coined by Kazimierz Michałowski.

External links
Website Study of Nubiology at the Polish Academy of Sciences

History of Nubia
Area studies by ancient history
Archaeology of Egypt
Archaeology of Sudan